Bulleid pacific may refer to the following classes of British steam railway locomotives:

 SR Merchant Navy Class
 SR West Country and Battle of Britain Classes